Nations and Nationalism is an influential 1983 book by the philosopher Ernest Gellner, in which the author expands on his theory of nationalism.

O'Leary describes the book as "Gellner's most elaborate statement on the subject (of nationalism); because it is largely an expansion of the themes first
sketched in Thought and Change.... he never repudiated any of the core propositions advanced in these texts", but he clarifies and qualifies some of them further in his Encounters with Nationalism (1994).

See also
Gellner's theory of nationalism
Nations and Nationalism (journal)

Sources

References

External links
Ernest Gellner’s Nations and Nationalism: A book critique. Saed Kakei

1983 non-fiction books
Books about nationalism
Books by Ernest Gellner
English-language books
Nations and Nationalism
Nations and Nationalism